Oakwood Cemetery Chapel is a historic chapel at 2420 Oakwood Drive in Cuyahoga Falls, Ohio.

It was built in 1898 and added to the National Register in 1999.

References

External links
 
 

Properties of religious function on the National Register of Historic Places in Ohio
Colonial Revival architecture in Ohio
Religious buildings and structures completed in 1898
Churches in Summit County, Ohio
National Register of Historic Places in Summit County, Ohio
Cuyahoga Falls, Ohio
1898 establishments in Ohio